The 2019–20 season was sixth consecutive season in the top Ukrainian football league for Olimpik Donetsk. Olimpik  competed in Premier League and Ukrainian Cup.

Players

Squad information

Transfers

In

Out

Pre-season and friendlies

Competitions

Overall

Premier League

League table

Results summary

Results by round

Matches

Ukrainian Cup

Statistics

Appearances and goals

|-
! colspan=16 style=background:#dcdcdc; text-align:center| Goalkeepers

|-
! colspan=16 style=background:#dcdcdc; text-align:center| Defenders

|-
! colspan=16 style=background:#dcdcdc; text-align:center| Midfielders 

|-
! colspan=16 style=background:#dcdcdc; text-align:center| Forwards

|-
! colspan=16 style=background:#dcdcdc; text-align:center| Players transferred out during the season

Last updated: 19 July 2020

Goalscorers

Last updated: 19 July 2020

Clean sheets

Last updated: 19 July 2020

Disciplinary record

Last updated: 19 July 2020

Attendances

Last updated: 19 July 2020

References

External links
 Official website 

Olimpik Donetsk
FC Olimpik Donetsk